Pelagibacterium  is a bacteria genus from the family Hyphomicrobiaceae.

References

Further reading 
 
 
 

Hyphomicrobiales
Bacteria genera